Luis La Fuente Ramírez, nicknamed "El Principe" (born June 8, 1947 in Callao) is a retired football defender player from Peru who played for Universitario de Deportes.

Club career
He won the Peruvian league five times, 4 with Universitario Universitario de Deportes (4): (1966, 1967, 1969, and 1971) and once with Defensor Lima (1973).

In 1975, he had a brief spell with Boca Juniors of Argentina.

International career
La Fuente made five appearances for the Peru national football team.

References

External links
 Boca Juniors statistics

1947 births
Living people
Sportspeople from Callao
Association football defenders
Peruvian footballers
Peru international footballers
Club Universitario de Deportes footballers
Boca Juniors footballers
Deportivo Municipal footballers
Peruvian expatriate footballers
Expatriate footballers in Argentina
Argentine Primera División players